Doris Neuner (born 10 May 1971) is an Austrian luger who competed during the 1990s. She won the gold medal in the women's singles event at the 1992 Winter Olympics in Albertville. Neuner's older sister, Angelika, won a silver medal in this same event at the same games and would win a bronze in this event at the 1998 Winter Olympics in Nagano.

Neuner also won four medals at the FIL World Luge Championships, winning two silvers (Mixed team: 1991, 1993) and two bronzes (Women's singles: 1993, Mixed team: 1995).

Her best finish in the overall Luge World Cup title was second in 1992-3.

References
1994 luge women's singles results

 

1971 births
Austrian female lugers
Living people
Lugers at the 1992 Winter Olympics
Lugers at the 1994 Winter Olympics
Olympic lugers of Austria
Olympic gold medalists for Austria
Olympic medalists in luge
Medalists at the 1992 Winter Olympics
20th-century Austrian women
21st-century Austrian women